A popular assembly is a gathering to address issues through direct democracy.

Popular assembly may also refer to:

Popular Assembly (Asamblea Popular), a socialist electoral coalition in Uruguay
Popular Assembly of the Peoples of Oaxaca, an organization assembled in 2006 in the Mexican state of Oaxaca
Popular Assembly for Progress Party (Rassemblement populaire pour le Progrès), a political party in Djibouti
Patriote popular assemblies, political gatherings in Lower Canada in 1837
Sree Moolam Popular Assembly, the first popularly elected legislature in India

See also
Citizens' assembly
People's Assembly (disambiguation)